The Jingle Cross Cyclo-cross festival, also known as Jingle Cross, is a cyclo-cross race held annually in Iowa City, Iowa, and founded and directed by John Meehan. It began as a small grassroots race with a single day race in 2004 and 60 competitors and expanded to two days in 2006. The 2007 edition was the first year with UCI events and expanded to 3 days in 2009 adding night time racing. Jingle Cross upgraded to a UCI C1 event in 2010 and soon became the largest cyclo-cross festival in North America. Jingle Cross was part of the UCI Cyclo-cross World Cup from 2016 to 2019.. The 2020 edition of Jingle Cross was cancelled due to the COVID-19 pandemic.

Jingle Cross is known for its challenging and holiday themed course. Originally held in December and late November, the venue and race course features many Christmas themed obstacles such as the Luge Run, Holly-Jolly Hell Hole, and Christmas Barn. The most famous element is Mt. Krumpit, a challenging climb which riders have to traverse in multiple locations as many as 3 times per lap. Jingle Cross moved to September in 2016 in order to be part of the UCI World Cup Series but kept the Holiday theme. Other events at the festival include an expanding gravel series and events for children. The festival also includes the Jingle Cross Doggy Cross, a cyclo-cross themed event for dogs, an international wine walk, an Oktoberfest, and a music festival.

Jingle Cross is owned and operated by Jingle Cross, Inc, a 501(c)3 non-profit organization. All proceeds from all festival activities are donated to local children's charities with the University of Iowa's Stead Family Children's Hospital as the primary beneficiary. Children from the hospital take part in the winner's podium celebration.

Past UCI men's winners

Race 1

Race 2

Race 3

Past UCI women's winners

Race 1

Race 2

Race 3

References
 Men's results
 Women's results

External links
 

UCI Cyclo-cross World Cup
Cycle races in the United States
Cyclo-cross races
Recurring sporting events established in 2007
2007 establishments in the United States